Pylon Point is a rocky promontory standing 4 nautical miles (7 km) southwest of Three Slice Nunatak and marking the north end of the main mountainous mass of Joerg Peninsula, on the east coast of Graham Land. Pylon Point lies in the area first seen by Sir Hubert Wilkins on his flight of December 20, 1928, and crossed by Lincoln Ellsworth on his flight of November 21, 1935. So named by the US-SCAN because the various flights and sledge trips of the United States Antarctic Service (USAS), 1939–41, rounded it on their way south along the east coast of Antarctic Peninsula.

Headlands of Graham Land
Bowman Coast